The Catholic Church in China comprises 152 Latin jurisdictions:
 21 ecclesiastical provinces (including one for Taiwan), consisting of 21 Metropolitan archdioceses and 100 suffragan dioceses 
 29 Apostolic Prefectures
 1 exempt diocese, the diocese of Macau
 1 Apostolic Administration, the Apostolic Administration of Harbin

Furthermore, the Eastern Catholic (Byzantine rite) Russian Greek Catholic Church has an exempt Apostolic exarchate for China in Harbin.

There is an Apostolic Nunciature as papal diplomatic representation (embassy-level) to China, in Taipei, national capital of Taiwan, also charged with Mainland China, Hong Kong and Macau.

The Catholic Church recognizes the Republic of China as the sole government for all of China; nevertheless, it does not recognize all of its territorial claims. The term “China” has to be understood as including Hong Kong, Macao, Taiwan in its 1949 provincial boundaries and Mainland China as effectively controlled by the People's Republic of China. Due to the non-recognition of the People's Republic of China, however, the authority of the Taipei-based Chinese Regional Bishops' Conference is effectively limited to the islands of Taiwan, Penghu, Kinmen and Matsu. The dioceses of Hong Kong (suffragan of Guangzhou) and Macao (exempt) do not belong to that conference. The dioceses of Mainland China take part in the Beijing-based Chinese Bishops Conference, which is not recognized by the Holy See.

Current Latin dioceses in Greater China 
Note that the diocese of Hong Kong belongs to the Ecclesiastical Province of Guangzhou, whereas the diocese of Macau is exempt. Also note that a small part of the diocese of Xiamen, the island of Kinmen, is administered by the Republic of China. At this moment, this part of the diocese is administered by the archdiocese of Taipei.

In all of greater China, only one non-Latin jurisdiction exists: an apostolic exarchate of the Russian Greek Catholic Church in Harbin. It has, however, been vacant since 1939.

However, the Chinese government has its own division of the dioceses, which is not necessarily identical to that of the Holy See. For example, many dioceses have been merged, and the difference between archdioceses, dioceses, apostolic prefectures and apostolic administrations has been abolished. Thus, according to the Chinese government, Mainland China is divided into 104 jurisdictions, all dioceses.

Originally, the ecclesiastical provinces were closely aligned with the civil provinces of China. However, the borders of most provinces have not been redrawn again for decades. As a general guideline, however, the ecclesiastical provinces largely correspond with the following civil provinces:

The ecclesiastical jurisdictions in Hainan, Macao, Qinghai and Xinjiang are all exempt, though Macao is a diocese (the others are apostolic prefectures or apostolic administrations). Heilongjiang is also exempt, being administered by three apostolic prefectures, with the exception of some parts of Mudanjiang, which belong to the Roman Catholic Diocese of Yanji, which is located in Jilin province (Ecclesiastical Province of Shenyang).

In the Apostolic Constitution of 11 April 1946, all provinces are named by the name of the civil province as well as by the name of the archdiocese. The province of Suiyuan is described as the province of Mongolia, and the province of Shenyang as the province of Manchuria. However, these two names are not used anymore.

Current Latin provinces and dioceses in PR China incl. Hong Kong

Ecclesiastical Province of Anqing
The Ecclesiastical Province of Anqing roughly covers the territory of Anhui province. The archdiocese is located in Anqing, even though Hefei has been the provincial capital since the 1940s - in fact, no diocese is located in Hefei. Also, apart from the archdiocese and the two diocese, there is also one exempt jurisdiction, the Apostolic Prefecture of Tunxi.
 Metropolitan Archdiocese of Anqing 安慶
 Diocese of Bengbu 蚌埠
 Diocese of Wuhu 蕪湖

Ecclesiastical Province of Beijing
The territory of the Ecclesiastical Province of Beijing is largely equal to that of Hebei province, when including Beijing and Tianjin. An important exception was Chengde; however, in 2018, the diocese of Chengde was erected, a suffragan of the archdiocese of Beijing, covering the entire prefecture-level city of Chengde. Furthermore, Puyang and Xinxiang's Changyuan County (Henan province) belong to the diocese of Daming (Ecclesiastical Province of Beijing), whereas Handan's Linzhang County, She County and Wu'an (all located in Hebei) belong to the diocese of Weihui (Ecclesiastical Province of Kaifeng). Shandongs Ningjin County also belongs to the diocese of Jingxian. Parts of Qinhuangdao and Zhangjiakou do not belong to the Ecclesiastical Province of Beijing. Furthermore, the Apostolic Prefecture of Yixian has not yet been elevated to the rank of diocese, and as such is not yet part of the Ecclesiastical Province of Beijing, but is still exempt. Furthermore, the Diocese of Xiwanzi belongs to the Ecclesiastical Province of Suiyuan (Inner Mongolia), even though its seat is located in Hebei province.

 Metropolitan Archdiocese of Beijing 北京
 Diocese of Anguo 安國
 Diocese of Baoding 保定 
 Diocese of Chengde 承德 
 Diocese of Daming 大名
 Diocese of Jingxian 景縣 (also known as Hengshui)
 Diocese of Shunde 順得
 Diocese of Tianjin 天津
 Diocese of Xianxian 獻縣 (also known as Cangzhou)
 Diocese of Xuanhua 宣化 (also known as Zhangjiakou)
 Diocese of Yongnian 永年
 Diocese of Yongping 永平 (also known as Tangshan)
 Diocese of Zhaoxian 趙縣
 Diocese of Zhengding 正定

Ecclesiastical Province of Changsha
The Ecclesiastical Province of Changsha roughly covers the territory of Hunan province. In Hunan province, five exempt jurisdictions are also located: the Apostolic Prefecture of Baoqing, the Apostolic Prefecture of Lixian, the Apostolic Prefecture of Xiangtan, the Apostolic Prefecture of Yongzhou and the Apostolic Prefecture of Yueyang.
 Metropolitan Archdiocese of Changsha 長沙
 Diocese of Changde 常德
 Diocese of Hengzhou 衡州
 Diocese of Yuanling 沅陵

Ecclesiastical Province of Chongqing
The Ecclesiastical Province of Chongqing roughly corresponds to Sichuan and Chongqing (Chongqing was separated from Sichuan in 1997) and also covers Tibet, though the diocese serving Tibet, the diocese of Kangding, is located in Sichuan. All the dioceses are located in Sichuan, except for Chongqing and Wanxian, which are located in Chongqing.
 Metropolitan Archdiocese of Chongqing 重慶
 Diocese of Chengdu 成都 
 Diocese of Jiading 嘉定
 Diocese of Kangding 康定
 Diocese of Ningyuan 甯遠
 Diocese of Shunqing 順慶
 Diocese of Suifu 敘府
 Diocese of Wanxian 萬縣

Ecclesiastical Province of Fuzhou
The Ecclesiastical Province of Fuzhou roughly covers the territory of Fujian province. In Fujian province, two exempt jurisdictions are also located: the Apostolic Prefecture of Jian'ou and the Apostolic Prefecture of Shaowu.
Note that Kinmen belongs to the diocese of Xiamen, but is administered by the archdiocese of Taipei.
 Metropolitan Archdiocese of Fuzhou 福州
 Diocese of Funing 福寧 
 Diocese of Tingzhou 汀州
 Diocese of Xiamen 廈門

Ecclesiastical Province of Guangzhou
The Ecclesiastical Province of Guangzhou roughly covers Guangdong and Hong Kong. Nearby Macau and Hainan are both exempt: the diocese of Macau and the Apostolic Prefecture of Hainan. Also, note that the diocese of Beihai is located in Guangxi.
 Metropolitan Archdiocese of Guangzhou 廣州
 Diocese of Beihai 北海
 Diocese of Hong Kong 香港
 Diocese of Jiangmen 江門
 Diocese of Jiaying 嘉應
 Diocese of Shantou 汕頭
 Diocese of Shaozhou 韶州

Ecclesiastical Province of Guiyang
The Ecclesiastical Province of Guiyang roughly covers the territory of Guizhou. In Guizhou province, one exempt jurisdiction is also located: the Apostolic Prefecture of Shiqian.
 Metropolitan Archdiocese of Guiyang 貴陽
 Diocese of Nanlong 南龍

Ecclesiastical Province of Hangzhou
The Ecclesiastical Province of Hangzhou roughly covers the territory of Zhejiang.
 Metropolitan Archdiocese of Hangzhou 杭州
 Diocese of Lishui 麗水 
 Diocese of Ningbo 寧波
 Diocese of Taizhou 台州
 Diocese of Yongjia 永嘉

Ecclesiastical Province of Hankou
The Ecclesiastical Province of Hankou roughly corresponds with Hubei. Hankou has been merged with Wuchang and Hanyang to form Wuhan in 1927. Apart from the dioceses, two exempt jurisdictions exist, the Apostolic Prefecture of Shashi and the Apostolic Prefecture of Suixian.
 Metropolitan Archdiocese of Hankou 漢口
 Diocese of Hanyang 漢陽 
 Diocese of Laohekou 老河口
 Diocese of Puqi 蒲圻
 Diocese of Qizhou 蘄州
 Diocese of Shinan 施南
 Diocese of Wuchang 武昌
 Diocese of Xiangyang 襄陽
 Diocese of Yichang 宜昌

Ecclesiastical Province of Jinan
Apart from the dioceses, Shandong province also has three apostolic prefectures: the Apostolic Prefecture of Weihai, the Apostolic Prefecture of Yiduxian (Qingzhou) and the Apostolic Prefecture of Linqing. However, even after taking this into account, the boundaries do not completely correspond with Shandong province.
 Metropolitan Archdiocese of Jinan 濟南
 Diocese of Caozhou 曹州 
 Diocese of Qingdao 青島
 Diocese of Yanggu 陽穀
 Diocese of Yantai 煙台
 Diocese of Yanzhou 兖州
 Diocese of Yizhou 沂州
 Diocese of Zhoucun 周村

Ecclesiastical Province of Kaifeng
The territory of the Ecclesiastical Province of Kaifeng is almost equal to that of Henan province. However, Puyang and Xinxiang's Changyuan County belong to the diocese of Daming (Ecclesiastical Province of Beijing), whereas Handan's Linzhang County, She County and Wu'an (all located in Hebei) belong to the diocese of Weihui. Furthermore, the Apostolic Prefecture of Xinxiang has not yet been elevated to the rank of diocese, and as such is not yet part of the Ecclesiastical Province of Kaifeng, but is still exempt.

Note that the archdiocese is located in Kaifeng, and not in Zhengzhou, the provincial capital of Henan since 1954.
 Metropolitan Archdiocese of Kaifeng 開封 
 Diocese of Guide 歸德 (also known as Shangqiu)
 Diocese of Luoyang 洛陽
 Diocese of Nanyang 南陽
 Diocese of Weihui 衛輝 (also known as Anyang)
 Diocese of Xinyang 信陽
 Diocese of Zhengzhou 鄭州
 Diocese of Zhumadian 駐馬店

Ecclesiastical Province of Kunming
The Ecclesiastical Province of Kunming roughly covers the territory of Yunnan. In Yunnan province, one exempt jurisdiction is also located: the Apostolic Prefecture of Zhaotong.
 Metropolitan Archdiocese of Kunming 昆明  
 Diocese of Dali 大理

Ecclesiastical Province of Lanzhou
The Ecclesiastical Province of Lanzhou roughly covers the territory of Gansu. Note that Xinjiang is covered by the Apostolic Prefecture of Xinjiang-Urumqi and Qinghai by the Apostolic Prefecture of Xining. Historically, both provinces were part of the Apostolic Vicariate (now Archdiocese) of Lanzhou.
 Metropolitan Archdiocese of Lanzhou 蘭州 
 Diocese of Pingliang 平涼
 Diocese of Qinzhou 秦州

Ecclesiastical Province of Nanchang
The Ecclesiastical Province of Nanchang roughly covers the territory of Jiangxi.
 Metropolitan Archdiocese of Nanchang 南昌
 Diocese of Ganzhou 贛州
 Diocese of Ji’an 吉安
 Diocese of Nancheng 南城
 Diocese of Yujiang 餘江

Ecclesiastical Province of Nanjing
The Ecclesiastical Province of Nanjing roughly covers the territory of Jiangsu and Shanghai. In Jiangsu province, two exempt jurisdictions are also located: the Apostolic Prefecture of Haizhou and the Apostolic Prefecture of Yangzhou.
 Metropolitan Archdiocese of Nanjing 南京
 Diocese of Haimen 海門
 Diocese of Shanghai 上海
 Diocese of Suzhou 蘇州
 Diocese of Xuzhou 徐州

Ecclesiastical Province of Nanning
The Ecclesiastical Province of Nanning roughly covers the territory of Guangxi. In Guangxi, one exempt jurisdiction is also located: the Apostolic Prefecture of Guilin. Also, note that the diocese of Beihai, which is located in Guangxi, is part of the Ecclesiastical Province of Guangdong.
 Metropolitan Archdiocese of Nanning 南寧
 Diocese of Wuzhou 梧州

Ecclesiastical Province of Shenyang
The Ecclesiastical Province of Shenyang (Shenyang is the capital of Liaoning) roughly covers Liaoning and Jilin. However, the Diocese of Chifeng belongs to the Ecclesiastical Province of Shenyang, but is located in Inner Mongolia. Furthermore, the diocese of Yanji (in Jilin) also covers a very small part of Heilongjiang. Some parts of the North-East are covered by exempt jurisdictions: the Apostolic Administration of Harbin, the Apostolic Prefecture of Jiamusi, the Apostolic Prefecture of Lindong and the Apostolic Prefecture of Qiqihar.

Harbin is also the seat of the Eastern Catholic Russian Catholic Apostolic Exarchate of Harbin, which, however, has been vacant since 1939 and only exists on paper.
 Metropolitan Archdiocese of Shenyang 瀋陽
 Diocese of Chifeng 赤峰 
 Diocese of Fushun 撫順
 Diocese of Jilin 吉林
 Diocese of Rehe 熱河
 Diocese of Sipingjie 四平街
 Diocese of Yanji 延吉
 Diocese of Yingkou 營口

Ecclesiastical Province of Suiyuan
Suiyuan is now known as Hohhot; the dioceses roughly cover Inner Mongolia and Ningxia, though the diocese of Xiwanzi is actually located in Hebei. Also, the Diocese of Chifeng is located in Inner Mongolia, but belongs to the Ecclesiastical Province of Shenyang.
 Metropolitan Archdiocese of Suiyuan 綏遠 (also known as Hohhot)
 Diocese of Jining 集寧 
 Diocese of Ningxia 寧夏
 Diocese of Xiwanzi 西彎子

Ecclesiastical Province of Taiyuan
The territory of the Ecclesiastical Province of Taiyuan is almost equal to that of Shanxi province. However, the Apostolic Prefecture of Xinjiang (also referred to as Yuncheng or Jiangzhou) has not yet been elevated to the rank of diocese, and as such is not yet part of the Ecclesiastical Province of Taiyuan, but is still exempt.
 Metropolitan Archdiocese of Taiyuan 太原
 Diocese of Datong 大同 
 Diocese of Fenyang 汾陽 (also known as Lüliang)
 Diocese of Hongdong 洪洞 (also known as Linfen)
 Diocese of Lu’an 潞安 (also known as Changzhi)
 Diocese of Shuozhou 朔州
 Diocese of Yuci 榆次 (also known as Jinzhong)

Ecclesiastical Province of Xi'an
Apart from the dioceses, Shaanxi province also has two apostolic prefectures: the Apostolic Prefecture of Tongzhou and the Apostolic Prefecture of Xing’anfu. However, even after taking this into account, the boundaries do not completely correspond with Shaanxi province.
 Metropolitan Archdiocese of Xi’an 西安
 Diocese of Fengxiang 鳳翔 
 Diocese of Hanzhong 漢中
 Diocese of Sanyuan 三原
 Diocese of Yan’an 延安
 Diocese of Zhouzhi 盩厔

Current Latin province and dioceses in Taiwan

Ecclesiastical Province of Taipei

Note that Kinmen and the Matsu Islands belong to the diocese of Xiamen, but are administered by the archdiocese of Taipei with its Archbishop serving as an Apostolic Administrator in respect of the islands.
Metropolitan Archdiocese of Taipei 
Diocese of Chiayi
Diocese of Hualien
Diocese of Hsinchu
Diocese of Kaohsiung 
Diocese of Taichung
Diocese of Tainan

Current exempt jurisdictions, immediately subject to the Holy See

Dioceses 
 Diocese of Macau

Apostolic Administrations 
 Apostolic Administration of Harbin in Heilongjiang

Apostolic Prefectures 
 Apostolic Prefecture of Baoqing (Paoking/Shaoyang) in Hunan
 Apostolic Prefecture of Guilin (Kweilin) in Guangxi
 Apostolic Prefecture of Hainan in Hainan
 Apostolic Prefecture of Haizhou (Donghai/ Haichow) in Jiangsu
 Apostolic Prefecture of Jiamusi (Kiamusze) in Heilongjiang
 Apostolic Prefecture of Jian'ou (Jianning/Kienning/Kienow) in Fujian
 Apostolic Prefecture of Lindong (Lintung) in Inner Mongolia
 Apostolic Prefecture of Linqing (Lintsing) in Shandong
 Apostolic Prefecture of Lixian (Lizhou/Lichow) in Hunan
 Apostolic Prefecture of Qiqihar (Tsitsikar) in Heilongjiang
 Apostolic Prefecture of Shaowu in Fujian
 Apostolic Prefecture of Shashi (Shasi) in Hubei
 Apostolic Prefecture of Shiqian (Shihtsien) in Guizhou
 Apostolic Prefecture of Suixian (Suihsien) in Hubei
 Apostolic Prefecture of Tongzhou (Tungchow) in Shaanxi
 Apostolic Prefecture of Tunxi (Tunki) in Anhui
 Apostolic Prefecture of Weihai (Weihaiwei) in Shandong
 Apostolic Prefecture of Xiangtan (Siangtan) in Hunan
 Apostolic Prefecture of Xing’anfu (Ankang/Hinganfu) in Shaanxi
 Apostolic Prefecture of Xining (Sining) in Qinghai
 Apostolic Prefecture of Xinjiang (Jiangzhou/ Kiangchow) in Shanxi
 Apostolic Prefecture of Xinjiang-Urumqi (Urumqi/Sinkiang/Xinjiang) in Xinjiang
 Apostolic Prefecture of Xinxiang (Sinsiang) in Henan
 Apostolic Prefecture of Yangzhou (Yangchow) in Jiangsu
 Apostolic Prefecture of Yiduxian (Iduhsien) in Shandong
 Apostolic Prefecture of Yixian (Yihsien) in Hebei
 Apostolic Prefecture of Yongzhou (Lingling/Yungchow) in Hunan
 Apostolic Prefecture of Yueyang (Yuezhou/Yochow) in Hunan
 Apostolic Prefecture of Zhaotong (Chaotung) in Yunnan

Eastern Catholic : Byzantine Rite 
 Russian Catholic Apostolic Exarchate of Harbin (particular Russian Greek Catholic Church)

Defunct jurisdictions 
Most former jurisdictions have current successor sees (although many are vacant).

Suppressed without 'direct' successor (all in continental China) :

(Arch)Diocesan 
There are no titular sees, and the Latin 
 Titular Patriarchal See of All the East was suppressed in 1370 after a single incumbent, the Archbishop of Khanbalik.
 Archdiocese of Khanbalik 
 Diocese of Citong
 Diocese of Ili-baluc alias Amaliaq alias Kulja (1320-1330)

Pre-diocesan 
(some had their title preserved when merged into another) 
 Apostolic Vicariate of Shansi
 Apostolic Vicariate of Kweichow
 Apostolic Vicariate of Kiangsi
 Apostolic Vicariate of Kokonur
 Mission sui juris of I-li (itself a late 'restoration' of the above diocese)

Dioceses according to the Chinese Patriotic Catholic Association 
The structure of dioceses of the CPCA is not the same one as the one of the Holy See. First of all, the distinction between archdioceses, dioceses, apostolic prefectures and apostolic administrations is not maintained: only dioceses exist. Secondly, the dioceses are structured according to the administrative divisions of the PRC. Many dioceses have been merged; some provinces are only served by a single diocese. Except for the diocese of Kangding, which also covers Tibet, all dioceses are restricted to territory within a single province.

In total the CPCA has 104 dioceses, whereas according to the Holy See, Mainland China has 143 jurisdictions. In the course of time, the CPCA has established five new dioceses (the Diocese of Jincheng and the Diocese of Xinzhou in Shanxi, the Diocese of Bayannur and the Diocese of Baotou in Inner Mongolia, and the Diocese of Zhanjiang in Guangdong. Forty-four other jurisdictions have been merged with other dioceses. For example, according to the Holy See, Hunan province exists of one archdiocese, three dioceses and four apostolic prefectures. These eight jurisdictions have all been merged by the CPCA to form a single diocese of Hunan. Furthermore, many dioceses have been renamed or have had their seat relocated to a nearby city; most of the dioceses boundaries have also been redrawn to correspond with current PRC administrative divisions. In general, Chinese prefectures have no more than one diocese, but there are exceptions: the prefecture of Baoding is divided in the Diocese of Baoding and the Diocese of Anguo.

This results in the following list of dioceses:

The CPCA has abolished and merged:
3 jurisdictions in Anhui
2 jurisdictions in Fujian
3 jurisdictions in Guangxi
2 jurisdictions in Guizhou
4 jurisdictions in Hebei
3 jurisdictions in Heilongjiang
6 jurisdictions in Hebei
7 jurisdictions in Hunan
1 jurisdiction in Inner Mongolia
2 jurisdictions in Jiangsu
4 jurisdictions in Jiangxi
2 jurisdictions in Jilin
3 jurisdictions in Liaoning
2 jurisdictions in Shandong

In total, 44 Holy See jurisdictions have been abolished and merged. This includes 26 out of 93 dioceses and 18 out of 29 apostolic prefectures.

The CPCA has established:
1 jurisdiction in Guangdong
2 jurisdictions in Inner Mongolia
2 jurisdictions in Shanxi

In total, 5 new CPCA jurisdictions have been established, all dioceses. Apart from these 5, the CPCA has also established a new diocese in Hebei, the Diocese of Chengde, but this diocese was recognized by the Holy See in 2018.

In the following provinces, no new dioceses were established and existing dioceses were not abolished: Beijing, Chongqing, Gansu, Hainan, Henan, Ningxia, Qinghai, Shaanxi, Shanghai, Sichuan, Tianjin, Tibet, Xinjiang, Yunnan and Zhejiang. In Guangdong and Zhejiang, no dioceses were abolished, but new diocese were established.

However, names of dioceses may have been changed, dioceses may have been elevated, and the boundaries of dioceses may have changed.

See also 
 List of Catholic dioceses (structured view)
 China–Holy See relations
 Holy See–Taiwan relations

Sources and external links 
 GCatholic.org.

References

China
Catholic dioceses